Sorry is the debut studio album recorded by American singer-songwriter Meg Myers. The album was released September 18, 2015 via Atlantic Records on CD, digital download, and on vinyl.

Track listing

Personnel

 Anne Declemente – A&R
 Steve Robertson – A&R
 Mark Obriski – art direction, design
 Rob Gold – art manager
 Chris Galland – assistant
 Cameron Lister – assistant
 Ike Schultz – assistant
 Doctor Rosen Rosen – bass, drum programming, engineer, guitar, instrumentation, piano, producer, programming, synthesizer
 Ken Oak – cello
 Meg Myers – composer, guitar, percussion, vocals
 Andrew Robert Rosen – composer
 Matt Chamberlain – drums
 Sam Gallagher – drums
 Matt Bayles – engineer
 Cameron Graham – engineer 
 Johannes Raassina – engineer
 Alex Todorov – engineer
 Ben Cassorla – acoustic guitar
 Mike Goldman – guitar, background vocals
 Steve Stevens – guitar
 Lauren Stockner – guitar
 Bianca Ortega – marketing coordinator
 Ryan Brady – marketing
 Brian "Busy" Dackowski – marketing
 Greg Calbi – mastering
 Caesar Edmunds – mixing engineer
 Ken Andrews – mixing
 Tony Hoffer – mixing
 John O'Mahony – mixing
 Manny Marroquin – mixing
 Alan Moulder – mixing
 Robert Orton – mixing
 Joe Visciano – mixing
 Joshua Skubel – packaging
 Joe Mullen – percussion
 Darren Ankenman – photography
 Catie Laffoon – photography
 Ethnikids – remixing
 Theodora "Teddy" Mae Rosen – toy instruments
 Maddie Ross – background vocals

Charts

Singles

References

2015 debut albums
Meg Myers albums
Synth-pop albums by American artists
Electronic rock albums by American artists